The Kaech'ŏn Colliery Line is an electrified railway line of the Korean State Railway in Kaech'ŏn city, South P'yŏngan Province, North Korea, running from Chajak on the Manp'o Line to Chŏnjin.

Route 

A yellow background in the "Distance" box indicates that section of the line is not electrified.

References

Railway lines in North Korea
Standard gauge railways in North Korea